Pompierre is a commune in the Vosges department, Grand Est, Northeastern France.

Geography

Pompierre (formerly Pont de Pierre) is traversed by the Mouzon River which is here crossed by the bridge from which it takes its name.

History
Situated on the line of a Roman road, the village gets its first mention in connection with a conflict between two grandsons of Clovis (himself often seen in France as the first French king).   In 577 Saint Gontran, king of Burgundy clashed with Childebert, the king of Neustria at 'Pont de Pierre'.   The event was commemorated with the construction of a chapel.   The chapel was replaced in the twelfth century with a church which contains sculptures that recall the encounter between the two kings.

In 1741 Jean-Baptiste de Lavaulx, lord of Pompierre, Sartes, Courcelles and Dolaincourt ordered the construction of a castle which can still be seen today.

See also
Communes of the Vosges department

References

Communes of Vosges (department)